Production of the Minié 4.D series of air-cooled, flat four engines began before World War II and resumed afterwards into the 1950s.

Design and development

Établissements Victor Minié, based in Colombes, only built low power flat-four aircraft engines, always using light alloy castings. Their first three known types, the  4 B0 Horus,  4 E0 Horus and  4 E2 Horus, produced only ,  and  respectively. The 4 B0 was available with either single or dual ignition but all others had dual ignition.

The 4.D series, also dual ignition engines, were larger and more powerful. Production began in 1938. Halted by the Occupation of France during World War II, it began again in 1946, continuing until the company closed in 1954. Apart from the D4 Horus, all post-war engines had separate head and cylinder castings rather than the pre-war pairs.

The name Horus was used with all Minié's engines from the mid-1930s until 1949.

Variants
Data from Erickson unless noted.

4.D0 Horus 1938. First of D series. Heads and cylinders cast in pairs. Bore/stroke , capacity , power .

4.D4 Horus 1946-8. Version of 4.D0 with same paired heads and cylinders. Specifications also as 4.D0.

4.DA.25 1946-53. Separate heads and cylinders. Power  at 2,430 rpm.

4.DA.28 Horus 1946-53. Horus name dropped in 1949. Bore/stroke , capacity , power  at 2,450 rpm.

4.DC.32 1949-53. The most widely used variant in terms of number of applications; more than 150 units built. Bore/stroke , capacity , power  at 2,575 rpm.

4.DF.28 1953-4. Bore/stroke , capacity , power  at 2,450 rpm.

4.DG.00 1953-4. Cylinders with hemispherical heads. Bore/stroke , capacity , power  at 2,250 rpm.

Applications
Data from Erickson unless noted.

4.D4 Horus
Duverne-Saran 01

4.DA.25 Horus
Mauboussin M.129

4.DA.28
Jodel D.114
Mauboussin M.129/48
Morane-Saulnier MS.602
Nord NC.851

4.DC.32
Adam RA-14 Loisirs
Bearn GY-201 Minicab
Brochet MB.71
Brochet MB.80
Chatelain AC.5 
Druine Turbi
Indraéro Aéro 101
Jodel D.111
Max Plan PF.204/14 Busard
Nord NC.853
SIPA S.901
SNCASO SO.7055 Deauville
Starck AS-80 Holiday

4.DF.28
Leopoldoff L.6 Colibri

Engines on display

4.D4 Horus at the Flugausstellung Peter Junior in Hermeskeil, Germany

Specifications (Minié 4.DC.32)

References

Air-cooled aircraft piston engines
1930s aircraft piston engines